Iván César Gabrich (born 28 August 1972 in Firmat, Santa Fe Province) is an Argentine retired footballer who played as a centre forward. He is currently the assistant manager of Newell's Old Boys.

References

External links
 Iván Gabrich – Argentine League statistics at Fútbol XXI  
 
 

1972 births
Living people
People from General López Department
Argentine footballers
Association football forwards
Argentine Primera División players
Newell's Old Boys footballers
Club Atlético Huracán footballers
Eredivisie players
AFC Ajax players
La Liga players
CP Mérida footballers
CF Extremadura footballers
RCD Mallorca players
Chilean Primera División players
Club Deportivo Universidad Católica footballers
Argentine expatriate footballers
Expatriate footballers in the Netherlands
Expatriate footballers in Spain
Expatriate footballers in Brazil
Expatriate footballers in Chile
Argentine expatriate sportspeople in the Netherlands
Argentine expatriate sportspeople in Spain
Argentine expatriate sportspeople in Brazil
Argentine expatriate sportspeople in Chile
Sportspeople from Santa Fe Province